The Carlos Palanca Memorial Awards for Literature winners in the year 1976 (rank, title of winning entry, name of author).


English division
Short story
First prize: “Taking Flight” by Paul Stephen Lim
Second prize: “Trilogy” by Leoncio P. Deriada
Third prize: “The Chieftain's Trophy, Abunnawas” by Jose Nadal Carreon

Poetry
First prize: “The Space Between” by Gémino H. Abad
Second prize: “Poyms Tch Tch Passwords” by Ricardo M. De Ungria
Third prize: “Three Obligations” by Alejandrino G. Hufana

One-act play
Special mention
“Age of Heroes” by Esteban Javellana
“El Supremo”  by Roel T. Argonza
“The Red Bikini” by Marina N. Cruz
“This Land is Mine” by Domingo Nolasco
“What Might Have Been” by Felix A. Clemente

Full-length play
First prize: “The Beatas” by Nick Joaquin
Second prize: No winner
Third prize: No winner
Special prize: “Like the Days of a Hireling” by Manuel M. Martell; and "The Primordial Quotient" by Elsa Martinez Coscolluela

Filipino division
Short story
First prize: “Alamat ng Sapang Bato” by Fanny A. Garcia
Second prize: “Araw ng mga Buldozer at Dapithapon sa Buhay ni Ato” by Jun Cruz Reyes
Third prize: “Ang Pangarap ni Isis” by Domingo G. Landicho

Poetry
First prize: “Sangkipil na Uhay” by Lamberto E. Antonio
Second prize: “Sa Pagtabon ng Gumuhong Bundok” by Teo T. Antonio
Third prize: No winner

One-act play
First prize: “Nang Pista sa Aming Bayan” by Nonilon Valdeamos Queano
Second prize: “Ang Daigdig sa Isang Handaan” by Mariano Calangasan
Third prize: “Ang Kanal” by Rolando C. Bartolome

Full-length play
First prize: “Alipato” by Nonilon Valdeamos Queano
Second prize: No winner
Third prize: No winner 
Special prizes: “Ang Artista sa Palengke” by Bienvenido Noriega Jr.; and “Isang Saglit sa Karimlan” by Azucena Grajo Uranza

References
 

Palanca Awards
1976 literary awards